Bostryx edmundi is a species of  tropical air-breathing land snail, a pulmonate gastropod mollusk in the family Bulimulidae.

Distribution 

Another locality is Magdalena [2300 m, 12°29’27’S 075°54’42’W], Lima Region, Peru is about 5 km north of the type locality.

References

Bulimulidae
Gastropods described in 2008